Limnodynastidae, commonly known as the Australian ground frogs, is a family of frogs found in Australia, New Guinea, and the Aru Islands. They were formerly considered a subfamily of the Myobatrachidae, the other large radiation of terrestrial frogs in Australia, but are now considered a distinct family. Both Limnodynastidae and Myobatrachidae are thought to be the only members of the superfamily Myobatrachoidea.

Taxonomy
The following genera are recognised in the family Limnodynastidae:

References

Limnodynastidae
Myobatrachoidea
Amphibian families
Amphibians of Australia
Amphibians of New Guinea
Amphibians of Papua New Guinea